Megachile rubtzovi is a species of bee in the family Megachilidae. It was described by Theodore Dru Alison Cockerell in 1928.-

References

Rubtzovi
Insects described in 1928